The Ministry of the Environment, Urban Planning and Public Works of Greece (commonly abbreviated as ΥΠΕΧΩΔΕ). Following the electoral victory of the Panhellenic Socialist Movement on 4 October 2009, the ministry was split up into a Ministry for the Environment, Energy and Climate Change, while its Public Works sector was merged with the Ministry for Transport and Communications to form the Ministry of Infrastructure, Transport and Networks.

List of ministers of the Environment, Urban Planning and Public Works

External links
 Official Website (in English) (Ministry for the Environment, Energy and Climate Change)
 Official Website (in Greek) (Ministry of Infrastructure, Transport and Networks)

Defunct government ministries of Greece
Lists of government ministers of Greece
Defunct environmental agencies
Greece, Environment, Physical Planning and Public Works